2 Nice Girls was the self-titled debut album of Two Nice Girls, released on Rough Trade Records in 1989.  This album contains the track "I Spent My Last $10 (On Birth Control & Beer)" which gained the group some commercial success. The album also features a track that combines The Velvet Underground's "Sweet Jane" with Joan Armatrading's "Love and Affection".

The album was re-released in 2007 and received a 4-star review from the Austin Chronicle.

Track listing
The Sweet Postcard (Barbara Hofrenning/Gretchen Phillips)
Follow Me (Jane Siberry)
Goons (Gretchen Phillips)
Money (Laurie Freelove)
I Spent My Last $10 On Birth Control & Beer (Gretchen Phillips)
Sweet Jane (With Affection) (L. Reed/J. Armatrading)
My Heart Crawls Off (Gretchen Phillips/Sara Hickman)
Looking Out (Laurie Freelove)
Heaven On Earth (Laurie Freelove)
Kick (Laurie Freelove)
The Holland Song (Kathy Korniloff)
Getting Close (CD reissue bonus track)
Cristi's Song (CD reissue bonus track)

"The Holland Song" was omitted from initial vinyl and cassette releases save for the UK release; all CD releases of the album reinstate it as the closing track.

Personnel
Gretchen Phillips – guitar, bass, mandolin & vocals
Kathy Korniloff – guitar, bass, violin, percussion & vocals
Laurie Freelove – guitar, bass, percussion & vocals

References

1989 debut albums
Two Nice Girls albums
Rough Trade Records albums